Bok Tower may refer to:

 BOK Tower, skyscraper in Downtown Tulsa, Oklahoma, USA
 Bok Tower, or Singing Tower, tourist attraction near Lake Wales, Florida, USA